FC Ripensia 2000 Timișoara was a Romanian women's football team from Timișoara, named after the homonym male club from the interwar period that played in the Romanian top-tier Liga I between 2006 and 2009.

History
Ripensia was founded in 2006 and it only participated in the Romanian Women's Cup in its first season, since the women's first league had already started. Its first official match was a 13–1 win against Reșița.
In the autumn of 2006 it joined Liga I, where it played for a total of 3 seasons. In its last season it was Liga I's runner-up and it won the national cup, defeating CSS Târgoviște 4–0 in the final.
However, the cup final was its last official match, as two months later the team was disbanded due to a lack of sponsors.
In 2011, several former players from the team joined newly created CFR Timișoara.

Honours

Leagues
Liga I
Runners-up (1): 2008–09

Cups
Romanian Women's Cup
Winners (1): 2008–09

Season by season

References

Sport in Timișoara
Association football clubs disestablished in 2009
Women's football clubs in Romania